WWE Velocity is an American professional wrestling television program that was produced by World Wrestling Entertainment (WWE) and ran from May 25, 2002 to June 11, 2006. It replaced two syndicated WWE shows, Jakked and Metal. Once a weekly Saturday night show on Spike TV and on Sky Sports 2 in the United Kingdom on Sunday mornings, Velocity became a webcast from 2005 to 2006. The newest episode would be uploaded to WWE.com on Saturdays and be available for the next week. Older webcast episodes were also archived. It served as a supplementary show to the SmackDown! brand, focusing more exclusively on its mid-card performers and matches, and was recorded before the week's television taping of SmackDown!. 8 episodes of Velocity are now available on Peacock in the United States and the WWE Network in international markets.

History

WWE Velocity was primarily used to summarize major occurrences on the latest episode of SmackDown!, which aired Thursday and later Friday nights on UPN. Due to the WWE Brand Extension, Velocity aired matches and content from the SmackDown brand. The format was set to mirror that of WWE Heat and its relation to the Raw brand.

Following Raws move from Spike TV back to the USA Network in 2005, Velocity and its Raw brand counterpart, Heat, were discontinued from television broadcast in the United States and Canada and became webcasts  streamed on WWE.com.  Internationally, Velocity and Heat continued to be broadcast on their respective television networks due to WWE's international programming commitments.

With the relaunch of ECW, Velocity was cancelled. The last episode of Velocity aired internationally on June 11, 2006. It was also the last episode to be streamed on WWE.com.

Commentators

Ring announcers

Television and Internet schedulesAustraliaFox8 - Saturday Afternoons (2002 - 2006)United StatesThe New TNN/Spike TV - Saturday Nights (2002-2005)
WWE.com - Saturdays (2005-2006)United Kingdom'''Sky Sports - Sunday Nights (2002-2004)Sky Sports - Sunday Mornings (2005-2006)

See alsoWWE Main Event''

References

External links
 

2002 American television series debuts
2005 web series debuts
2006 web series endings
2006 American television series endings
Spike (TV network) original programming
Velocity
Velocity
American non-fiction web series
WWE SmackDown